Psychology of Sexual Orientation and Gender Diversity is a quarterly peer-reviewed academic journal published by the American Psychological Association. The journal is the official publication of APA Division 44 (Society for the Psychological Study of Lesbian, Gay, Bisexual, and Transgender Issues). A scholarly journal dedicated to the dissemination of information in the field of sexual orientation and gender diversity, the journal is a primary outlet for research particularly as it impacts practice, education, public policy, and social action.

Abstracting and indexing 
The journal is abstracted and indexed by PsycINFO.

See also 
 List of psychology journals
 LGBT
 List of LGBT periodicals

Editors 
The current editor-in-chief is M. Paz Galupo (Towson University).

References

External links 
 

American Psychological Association academic journals
Quarterly journals
English-language journals